The Rock GAA is a Gaelic Athletic Association gaelic football club based just outside the town of Mountmellick in County Laois, Ireland.

History
The club was founded in 1970 and colours are red and black.

Famous Laois footballers who have played for The Rock include Derek Conroy, Paul Dunne, Mark Dunne and Colm Burke.

The first AGM of The Rock GAA Club was held in 1970 in The Rock National School.

The club first entered the Laois Junior Football Championship in 1970, where in their first match they played against Emo and made an instant impact on the local GAA scene recording a win in their first outing.

The Rock won the Laois Junior Football Championship in 1979 defeating Ballinakill in the final, which was played in O'Moore Park. The captain was Noel Dunphy and vice-captain was John Deegan.

The Rock won the Laois Intermediate Football Championship in 1996 defeating St. Michaels in a replayed final in Stradbally. The captain was Leo Storey and the manager was Niall Tully.

The Rock competed in their first ever Senior Football Championship Final in 1998 where they suffered defeat to Stradbally on a scoreline of 0-8 to 0-5 on a day of atrocious weather conditions.

In 2011 and 2012, an Emo, Courtwood and The Rock minor combination won two Laois Minor "B" Football Championships and two Laois Minor Football League B titles.

In 2016, Emo, Courtwood and The Rock again joined forces at minor level and won the Laois Minor Football Championship.

Club Member Donal Mooney is thought to be the oldest player to play a competitive game in GAA history when he took to the field in Sept 2018 in a junior B league game against The Heat at the age of 63.

The Rock National School works closely with the club usually using its GAA facilities for P.E

Achievements
 Laois Senior Football Championship: Runner-Up 1998
 Laois Intermediate Football Championship 1996
 Laois Junior Football Championships 1979
 Laois All-County Football League Div. 2: (2) 1993, 1997
 Laois All-County Football League Div. 4: (1) 2000
 Laois All-County Football League Div. 5: (1) 2014

References

Gaelic games clubs in County Laois
Gaelic football clubs in County Laois